"I'm Going In" is a song by Belgian DJ Laurent Wéry, featuring vocals by Clarence. Written by Phil Wilde, Laurent Wery and Bernard Ansong, the song was released in Belgium as a digital download on 23 July 2012.

Track listing
Digital download
 "I'm Going In" (Phil Wilde Radio Edit) – 3:22
 "I'm Going In" (Phil Wilde Extended Mix) – 6:03
 "I'm Going In" (Phil Wilde Club Mix) – 6:03

Credits and personnel
Lead vocals – Clarence
Producers – Phil Wilde, Laurent Wery
Lyrics – Phil Wilde, Laurent Wery, Bernard Ansong
Label: La Musique du Beau Monde

Chart performance

Release history

References

2012 singles
Laurent Wéry songs
2012 songs
Songs written by Laurent Wéry
Songs written by Phil Wilde
CB Milton songs